Tianwen-2, formerly known as ZhengHe, is a planned Chinese asteroid sample-return and comet exploration mission that is currently under development.

Overview 
Tianwen-2 is planned to be launched by a Long March 3B rocket around 2025. It will use solar electric propulsion to explore the co-orbital near-Earth asteroid 469219 Kamoʻoalewa and the main-belt comet 311P/PANSTARRS. A nano-orbiter and nano-lander will be deployed to conduct remote sensing and sampling observations, and explosives will be used to expose potential subsurface volatiles for detection.

The spacecraft will use both anchor-and-attach and touch-and-go methods to attempt collection of a sample from the asteroid. It would be the first time an anchor-and-attach method has been used on an asteroid, as both OSIRIS-REx and Hayabusa2 used touch-and-go.

Tianwen-2 will then return to Earth to drop off a return capsule containing the sample and conduct a gravity assist maneuver to propel the spacecraft toward Mars, where a second gravity assist will be performed to direct it to 311P/PANSTARRS. A flyby of an unnamed asteroid may also be attempted en route to 311P/PANSTARRS. Remote sensing and in-situ measurements will be conducted at 311P/PANSTARRS for at least one year.

The original name of this mission referenced the 15th century Ming Dynasty explorer ZhengHe.

History 
In 2018, a deep space exploration roadmap covering the 2020–2030 timeframe was proposed by researchers at the Chinese Academy of Sciences, which included an asteroid exploration mission planned for launch around 2022 or 2024. In spring 2019, after a design study for the mission was carried out by the Chinese Academy of Space Technology (CAST), the CNSA began soliciting international proposals for scientific instruments to be carried on Tianwen-2.

Instruments 
Tianwen-2 will incorporate several types of instruments, including wide/narrow angle multispectral and color cameras, a thermal emission spectrometer, a visible/near-infrared imaging spectrometer, a mass spectrometer, a magnetometer, and a charged/neutral particle and dust analyzer. International contributions to these payloads are being encouraged.

The United Kingdom is considering a proposal for a penetrator to deliver a mass spectrometer to probe the subsurface ice of 311P/PANSTARRS.

References

External links 

Chinese space probes
Sample return missions
2025 in spaceflight
2025 in China
Missions to comets
Missions to near-Earth asteroids
Proposed space probes